The highest-selling albums and EPs in the United States are ranked in the Billboard 200, which is published by Billboard magazine. The data are compiled by Nielsen Soundscan based on each album's weekly physical and digital sales. In 2014, a total of 33 albums claimed the top position of the chart. One of which, American R&B singer Beyoncé's self-titled visual album started its peak in late 2013.

The soundtrack to the 2013 Disney film, Frozen was the longest-running number-one album of the year, staying atop the chart for thirteen non-consecutive weeks. Other albums with extended chart runs include Beyoncé's self-titled visual album, Ghost Stories by Coldplay, the Marvel soundtrack Guardians of the Galaxy: Awesome Mix Vol. 1 and 1989 by Taylor Swift; only three albums spent two weeks on the top position.

The Frozen soundtrack sold 165,000 additional copies in its sixth week upon its week, bringing its sales up to nearly 2.7 million units, becoming the highest-selling album during the debut week. Taylor Swift's 1989 sold 1.28 million copies in its first week, making it the second album with the highest sales during the opening week, since 2002 when Eminem's third album, The Eminem Show opened up with 1.3 million.

Chart history

See also
2014 in music
List of Billboard Hot 100 number-one singles of 2014
List of Billboard number-one country albums of 2014

References

External links 
Current Billboard 200 chart
Billboard Chart Archives – Billboard 200 (2014)

2014
United States Albums